Rising Up and Rising Down: Some Thoughts on Violence, Freedom and Urgent Means is a seven-volume essay on the subject of violence by American author William T. Vollmann. First published by McSweeney's in November 2003, it was nominated for the National Book Critics Circle Award. A single-volume condensed version was published at the end of the year by Ecco Press, an abridgment Vollmann explained by saying, "I did it for the money." Representing over 20 years of work, Rising Up and Rising Down attempts to establish a moral calculus to consider the causes, effects, and ethics of violence. Much of it consists of Vollmann's own reporting from places wracked by violence, among them Cambodia, Somalia, and Iraq. The unabridged edition was only published in one limited run of 3,500 copies.

Subject and method
Rising Up and Rising Down is a wide-ranging study of the justifications for and consequences of violence. The seven-volume edition is divided between essays analyzing the actions and motivations of historical figures (including Napoleon, Abraham Lincoln, John Brown, Robespierre, Cortés, Trotsky, Stalin, and Gandhi) and pieces of journalism and reportage that act as contemporary "case studies" on the problem of violence. The first volume of the set is given over to the "Moral Calculus",  Vollmann's attempt to outline rules for when and where violence is justified. Generally, Vollmann maintains that violence is justifiable only in cases of immediate self-defence and defense of innocents - on higher, politically organized levels, justifications of violence are likely to lead to the harm of innocents. This is the longest of Vollmann's works. It is notable for its inclusion of much of Vollmann's reportage and journalism, containing the full versions of many pieces originally commissioned for Harper's, Esquire, and other magazines.

Contents
 MC (Moral Calculus): Annotated Contents/The Moral Calculus/Index/Annexes/Sources Cited
 Volume I: Meditations/Introduction/Definitions
 Volume II: Justifications Honor/Class/Authority/Race and Culture/Creed
 Volume III: Justifications War Aims/Homeland/Ground/Earth/Animals/Gender/Traitors/Revolution
 Volume IV: Justifications Deterrence/Punishment/Loyalty/Sadism/Moral Yellowness/Inevitability   Evaluations Safeguards/The Victim
 Volume V: Studies in Consequences Southeast Asia/Europe/Africa
 Volume VI: "Studies in Consequences" The Muslim World/North America/South America/Perception and Irrationality

References

2003 non-fiction books
McSweeney's books
American non-fiction books
Anti-war books
Works by William T. Vollmann
Books about violence